Adamo Bozzani (8 September 1891 – 31 January 1969) was an Italian gymnast. He competed in the men's team event at the 1908 Summer Olympics.

References

1891 births
1969 deaths
Italian male artistic gymnasts
Olympic gymnasts of Italy
Gymnasts at the 1908 Summer Olympics
Sportspeople from Ferrara